Events from the year 1152 in Ireland.

Incumbents
High King: Toirdelbach Ua Conchobair

Events
Synod of Kells-Mellifont results in a national church organisation with four metropolitans (archbishoprics) and 36 sees, under the primacy of Armagh. 
The Archdiocese of Dublin,, recognised as a metropolitan province in by the Synod of Kells. 
Diarmaid mac Murchadha elopes with Devorgill.
Cloyne was recognised as a diocese at the Synod of Kells

References